is a Japanese voice actress formerly employed by Arts Vision.

Filmography

Television animation
Gyakuten! Ippatsuman (1982) - Ran Houmu
Tokimeki Tonight (1982) - Ranze Eto
Ginga Hyōryū Vifam (1983) - Shalon Publin
Once Upon a Time... Space (1984) - Petit
Blue Comet SPT Layzner (1985) - Rei
Mobile Suit Gundam ZZ (1986) - Elle Vianno
Uchūsen Sagittarius (1986) - Karin
Kimagure Orange Road (1987) - Hikaru Hiyama
Goldfish Warning! (1991) - Cow Beauty 
Sailor Moon (1992) - Murido
The Brave Express Might Gaine (1993) - Ruriko Senpuji
Muka Muka Paradise (1993) - Ranka Gotenba
Sailor Moon R (1993) - Nipasu
Slam Dunk (1993) - Ayako
Sailor Moon S (1994) - Unazuki Furuhata
Sailor Moon SuperS (1995) - Hebihanabiko, Paopao-musume
Sailor Moon Sailor Stars (1996) - Sailor Iron Mouse/Chuuko Nezu
Mamotte Shugogetten (1998) - Kaori Aihara

Theatrical animation
Doraemon: Nobita's Parallel "Journey to the West" (1988) - Princess
Venus Wars (1989) - Susan
Soreike! Anpanman Yomigaere Bananajima (2012) - Pyonkichi

OVA
Gall Force (1986) - Patty
Wanna-Be's (1986) - Miki Morita

Video games
Super Robot Wars Alpha (2000) - Elle Vianno
Xenosaga Episode I: Der Wille zur Macht (2002) - Pellegri
Super Robot Wars Alpha 2 (2003) - Elle Vianno
Xenosaga Episode II: Jenseits von Gut und Böse (2004) - Pellegri
Super Robot Wars Alpha 3 (2005) - Elle Vianno
Xenosaga Episode III: Also Sprach Zarathustra (2006) - Pellegri
Super Robot Wars V (2017) - Elle Vianno
Super Robot Wars X (2018) - Elle Vianno
Super Robot Wars T (2019) - Elle Vianno

References

External links
 
 

1959 births
Living people
Japanese video game actresses
Japanese voice actresses
Voice actresses from Tokyo
20th-century Japanese actresses
21st-century Japanese actresses
Arts Vision voice actors